The Crossover Classic (branded as the Crossover Classic presented by Mammoth Sports Construction for sponsorship reasons) is an early-season college basketball tournament that first took place November 25–30, 2020, at the Sanford Pentagon in Sioux Falls, South Dakota.

The tournament was originally established in 2020, intending to be a de facto substitute for the Battle 4 Atlantis tournament following its cancellation due to the COVID-19 pandemic; organizers invited all of the teams that had been invited to participate that year, but due to withdrawals only two of the originally-invited teams participated. The tournament returned for 2021, this time as a four-team round robin event.

Background 
The Battle 4 Atlantis tournament in Nassau, Bahamas was cancelled due to logistical issues tied to the COVID-19 pandemic. In the wake of the decision, a representative of the event was contacted by one of the teams' coaches, suggesting that an event could be held at the Pentagon. Attempts were made to invite all of the teams who had originally been slated to compete at the 2020 edition of the Battle 4 Atlantis, with only Duke declining. South Dakota had among the highest rates of new COVID-19 cases per-capita nationwide, but the tournament and venue's association with the local Sanford Health system was stated by organizers as allowing them to "put together a plan to make this a safe environment for all the teams that have committed to playing here."

Creighton, Dayton, Ohio State, Texas A&M, and Utah dropped out of the tournament prior to the event. The day before the tournament was scheduled to begin, Wichita State withdrew due to a COVID-19 outbreak on the team, leaving only two of the originally-invited teams left. It was originally planning to admit a limited number of spectators per-game, but on November 23 it was announced that the tournament would be played behind closed doors with no spectators admitted.

The tournament returned for 2021, switching to a round-robin format with four invited teams.

Tournament history

Tournament champions

Brackets

2020

2021
The 2021 edition of the Crossover Classic was a round-robin tournament held from November 22-24, played between South Dakota State, Washington, Nevada and George Mason.

References

External links
Official site of the Crossover Classic

College basketball competitions
College men's basketball competitions in the United States
Recurring sporting events established in 2020
Basketball in South Dakota